The 2021 United Rentals 176 at The Glen was the 15th stock car race of the 2021 NASCAR Camping World Truck Series season and the 6th iteration of the event, after a 20 year absence of Truck racing at Watkins Glen International. The race was held on Saturday, August 7, 2021 at Watkins Glen, New York in Watkins Glen International. The race was shortened to 61 laps from 72 laps due to lightning near the track during the race. Austin Hill of Hattori Racing Enterprises would win the lightning-shortened event, while John Hunter Nemechek of Kyle Busch Motorsports and Sheldon Creed of GMS Racing took second and third, respectively.

Background 
Watkins Glen International (nicknamed "The Glen") is an automobile race track located in Watkins Glen, New York at the southern tip of Seneca Lake. It was long known around the world as the home of the Formula One United States Grand Prix, which it hosted for twenty consecutive years (1961–1980), but the site has been home to road racing of nearly every class, including the World Sportscar Championship, Trans-Am, Can-Am, NASCAR Sprint Cup Series, the International Motor Sports Association and the IndyCar Series.

Initially, public roads in the village were used for the race course. In 1956 a permanent circuit for the race was built. In 1968 the race was extended to six hours, becoming the 6 Hours of Watkins Glen. The circuit's current layout has more or less been the same since 1971, although a chicane was installed at the uphill Esses in 1975 to slow cars through these corners, where there was a fatality during practice at the 1973 United States Grand Prix. The chicane was removed in 1985, but another chicane called the "Inner Loop" was installed in 1992 after J.D. McDuffie's fatal accident during the previous year's NASCAR Winston Cup event.

The circuit is known as the Mecca of North American road racing and is a very popular venue among fans and drivers. The facility is currently owned by International Speedway Corporation.

Entry list

Starting lineup 
The grid was set by a competition-based formula based on the previous race. As a result, Austin Hill of Hattori Racing Enterprises would win the pole.

Race results 
Stage 1 Laps: 

Stage 2 Laps: 

Stage 3 Laps:

References 

2021 NASCAR Camping World Truck Series
NASCAR races at Watkins Glen International
United Rentals 176 at The Glen
United Rentals 176 at The Glen